The Producers Guild Film Award for Best Actor in a Comic Role (previously known as the Apsara Award for Best Actor in a Comic Role) is given by the producers of the film and television guild as part of its annual award ceremony for Hindi films, to recognise an actor who has delivered an outstanding performance in a comic role. While the official awards ceremony started in 2004, this category was first introduced four years later.

Superlatives

Winners and nominees

2000s
 2004 – No award
 2005 – No award
 2006 – No award
 2007 – No award
 2008 Vinay Pathak – Bheja Fry as Bharat Bhushan
 Akshay Kumar – Bhool Bhulaiyaa as Dr. Aditya Shrivastav
 Govinda – Partner as Bhaskar Devakar Chaudhary
 Irrfan Khan – Life in a... Metro as Monty
 Javed Jaffrey – Dhamaal as Manav Shrivastav
 2009 Anil Kapoor – Welcome as Majnu Bhai
 Boman Irani – Dostana as M aka Murli
 Nana Patekar – Welcome as Uday Shetty
 Rajpal Yadav – Bhoothnath as "The Bhooth" Anthony
 Shreyas Talpade – Welcome to Sajjanpur as Mahadev Kushwaha

2010s
 2010 Ajay Devgn – All the Best: Fun Begins as Prem Chopra
 Darshan Jariwala – Ajab Prem Ki Ghazab Kahani as Shiv Shankar Sharma
 Ritesh Deshmukh – Do Knot Disturb as Govardhan
 Sanjay Mishra – Aloo Chaat as Chhadami Mama
 Vinay Pathak – Rab Ne Bana Di Jodi as Balwinder "Bobby" Khosla
 2011 Paresh Rawal – Atithi Tum Kab Jaoge? as Lambodar Bajpai (Chachaji)
 Jamnadas Majethia – Khichdi: The Movie as Himanshu Seth
 Omkar Das Manikpuri – Peepli Live as Natha 
 Ritesh Deshmukh – Housefull as Baburao (Bob)
 Sanjay Mishra – Phas Gaye Re Obama as Bhai Saab
 2012 Deepak Dobriyal - Tanu Weds Manu as Pappi Ji
 Bobby Deol - Yamla Pagla Deewana as Gajodhar Singh Dhillon
 Javed Jaffrey - Double Dhamaal as Manav Shrivastav
 Kartik Tiwari - Pyaar Ka Punchnama as Rajat
 Paresh Rawal - Ready as Balidaan Bhardwaj
 2013 Abhishek Bachchan & Annu Kapoor - Bol Bachchan & Vicky Donor as Abbas Ali/Abhishek Bachchan & Dr. Baldev Chaddha
 Ritesh Deshmukh - Kyaa Super Kool Hain Hum as Sid
 Krishna Abhishek - Bol Bachchan as Ravi Shastri
 Rishi Kapoor - Student of the Year as Deon Yogendra Vasisth
 Johnny Lever - Housefull 2 as Mithai Patil
 2014 Varun Sharma & Arshad Warsi - Fukrey & Jolly LLB as Dilip Singh & Jagdish Tyagi/Jolly
 2015 Varun Dhawan - Main Tera Hero as Seenu
2016 Deepak Dobriyal - Tanu Weds Manu: Returns as Pappi Kutti

See also
 Producers Guild Film Awards

Producers Guild Film Awards